The 1924 Pottsville Maroons season was their 5th season in existence. The team played in the Anthracite League would go on to post a 12-1-1 record and claim the League Championship. The team would play in the National Football League the following year.

Schedule

Game notes
Asterisk denotes Anthracite League games.

Final overall standings

References
Pro Football Archives: 1924 Pottsville Maroons season

1924
Boston
Pottsville Mar